Jim Serdaris (born 1 October 1971) is an Australian former professional rugby league. He played for the South Sydney Rabbitohs, Canterbury-Bankstown Bulldogs, Western Suburbs Magpies, Manly-Warringah Sea Eagles. He also represented New South Wales and played one game for the Australian national side.

Career
Serdaris won the Dally M Rookie of the Year in 1989. At the end of the 1994 NSWRL season, he went on the 1994 Kangaroo tour, the last Western Suburbs player to ever tour with the Kangaroos. He was selected to represent New South Wales as a hooker for all three games  of the 1995 State of Origin series and played his only Test for Australia in the subsequent series against New Zealand. Serdaris was a member of the 1996 Grand Final winning Manly-Warringah team which defeated St. George Dragons, 20–8. Although his Australian first-grade career came to an end in 1999, Serdaris returned to rugby league in 2002, joining French club Pia XIII.

References

Sources

External links

1971 births
Living people
Australia national rugby league team players
Australian expatriate rugby league players
Australian expatriate sportspeople in France
Australian people of Greek descent
Australian rugby league players
Baroudeurs de Pia XIII players
Canterbury-Bankstown Bulldogs players
Expatriate rugby league players in France
Manly Warringah Sea Eagles players
New South Wales City Origin rugby league team players
New South Wales Rugby League State of Origin players
Rugby league hookers
Rugby league players from Sydney
South Sydney Rabbitohs players
Western Suburbs Magpies players